Armando "Chino" Cabañas (1878 - November 21, 1959) was a Cuban baseball second baseman in the Cuban League. He played from 1899 to 1916 with several ballclubs, including San Francisco, Almendares, Fe club, Habana, Azul, and the Cuban Stars (West). He was elected to the Cuban Baseball Hall of Fame in 1959.

References

External links

1878 births
1959 deaths
Cuban League players
Club Fé players
Habana players
Almendares (baseball) players
Azul (baseball) players
San Francisco (baseball) players
Baseball players from Havana